The 1910 European Floods were a series of floods that struck Central Europe in mid-June 1910. The flooding was the result of several days of heavy rains, and resulted in severe flooding to the Ahr River in Germany, which killed up to 200 people in the Ahr Valley. The town of Schuld was particularly hard hit where at least 50 people were reported to have been killed after a bridge gave way during the flooding. Reports from the time also claimed that almost every bridge in the valley was destroyed by the flooding.

The rains also resulted in flooding in Switzerland, where at least 26 people were reported to have been killed around Lake Lucerne. Flooding was reported in Lucerne and Zurich where the city electric lighting systems were compromised. The worst human loss however was reported in Hungary where over 1000 people were reported killed which was reported as "exceeding all records". Elsewhere severe flooding also occurred in Austria, Belgium, and Serbia. Serbia in particular saw severe flooding on the Great Morava river which resulted in severe damage to cities such as Jagodina as well as an additional 35 fatalities.

References 

1910 in Germany
1910 in Switzerland
1910 in Hungary
Floods in Germany
Floods in Switzerland
Floods in Hungary
June 1910 events
1910 natural disasters
1910 floods in Europe
1910 disasters in Europe